James Andrew Baird was a college football player.

University of North Carolina
He was a prominent tackle for the North Carolina Tar Heels football team of the University of North Carolina.

1895
In 1895, Baird was selected All-Southern.

References

American football tackles
All-Southern college football players
North Carolina Tar Heels football players
19th-century players of American football